is the 16th single of Japanese rock band Asian Kung-Fu Generation for their first best-of album Best Hit AKG. The single was released on November 30, 2011. The song "N2" is also featured on the album Landmark.

Music video 
The music video for "Marching Band" was directed by Sojiro Kamatani . The video features a school girl (Sasha Ueda) running towards a boy in slow motion and greet him.

Track listing

Personnel
Masafumi Gotoh – lead vocals, rhythm guitar
Kensuke Kita – lead guitar, background vocals
Takahiro Yamada –  bass, background vocals
Kiyoshi Ijichi – drums
Asian Kung-Fu Generation – producer

Charts

Release history

References 

Asian Kung-Fu Generation songs
2011 singles
Songs written by Masafumi Gotoh
2011 songs
Ki/oon Music singles